Piedmont Camp Meeting Grounds Historic District is a national historic district located at Piedmont, Montgomery County, Virginia.  The district encompasses 22 contributing buildings associated with a camp meeting, a seasonal religious campground. The district includes a large, rustic tabernacle (1939), a group of
small frame cabins, a dining hall in a former church building (c. 1910), the concrete block Piedmont Pentecostal Holiness Church (1936, 1957), and the nave-plan Piedmont Methodist Church (c. 1873), the district's oldest building. The tabernacle is the principal structure in the campground, and is an aisled gable roofed frame structure open on three sides and supported by untrimmed logs. The Piedmont Methodist Church is the church from which the Piedmont Pentecostal Holiness group broke away.

It was listed on the National Register of Historic Places in 1991.

References

Properties of religious function on the National Register of Historic Places in Virginia
Historic districts in Montgomery County, Virginia
National Register of Historic Places in Montgomery County, Virginia
Historic districts on the National Register of Historic Places in Virginia
Camp meeting grounds
Methodism in Virginia